South Arts, formerly the Southern Arts Federation, headquartered in Atlanta, Georgia, is one of six not-for-profit regional arts organizations funded by the National Endowment for the Arts (NEA). South Arts creates partnerships and collaborations, assists in the professional development of artists, arts organizations and arts professionals; presents, promotes and produces Southern arts and cultural programming; and advocates for the arts and arts education. The organization works in partnership with the nine state arts councils of Alabama, Florida, Georgia, Kentucky, Louisiana, Mississippi, North Carolina, South Carolina and Tennessee.

History
Founded in 1975, South Arts is one of six not-for-profit, regional arts organizations (RAO's) funded by the National Endowment for the Arts (NEA). The NEA's House reauthorizing committee encouraged the development of RAO's in 1973 to create a more effective mechanism for delivering services, especially those related to touring and presenting the performing arts. The United States Congress sets aside a specific appropriation within the NEA budget for the "states and their regional organizations."

The legislation creating South Arts and the other Regional Arts Organizations was introduced by Public Law 93-133:
2/7/1973 	Legislation introduced in Senate
4/3/1973 	Reported to Senate, amended, S. Rept. 93-100.
5/2/1973 	Passed/agreed to in Senate: Measure passed Senate, amended, roll call #112 (76-14).
6/14/1973 	Passed/agreed to in House: Measure passed House, amended in lieu of H.R. 3926.
10/4/1973 	Conference report agreed to in Senate: Senate agreed to conference report.
10/19/1973 	Public law 93-133 signed by President.

South Arts is supported additionally with funding from private foundations, corporations, individuals and dues paid by member states, which include Alabama, Georgia, Florida, Kentucky, Louisiana, Mississippi, North Carolina, South Carolina, Tennessee.

Programs
South Arts uses many programs in order to promote and support Arts in the South.  These include:
Folklorists in the South Retreat (FITS) :  Explores Tradition in a Contemporary World with a great roster of workshop and session leaders who will provide new information, resource methodology and technology tools to further research, teaching and public programs.
Performing Arts Exchange (PAE):PAE is a 4-day conference that creates opportunities for networking and transacting business.  This conference is the primary forum for professional development for artists, artist managers and presenters.
SouthernArtistry.org :  A free, online registry that showcases Southern visual and media artists, writers, performers and arts educators who have been nominated by their state arts agency based on the quality of their work.
Podcasts :  In October 2006, South Arts published its first podcast in support of its Southern Circuit program.
Southern Circuit - Tour of Independent Filmmakers : Originated by South Carolina Arts Commission in 1975, Southern Circuit provides communities across the South with a tour of highly talented independent filmmakers.
Southern Visions : A traveling exhibit program that showcases traditional and contemporary art throughout the Southern United States.
Traditional Arts : South Arts identifies, promotes and presents indigenous southern arts and culture, in addition to the traditional arts of immigrant communities who make the South their home, to regional, national and international audiences.

Partners
South Arts works in partnership with nine member state arts councils:
Alabama State Council on the Arts
Georgia Council for the Arts
Florida Division of Cultural Affairs
Kentucky Arts Council
Louisiana Division for the Arts
Mississippi Arts Commission
North Carolina Arts Council
South Carolina Arts Council
Tennessee Arts Commission

Further reading
 Binkiewicz, Donna M. Federalizing the Muse: United States Arts Policy and the National Endowment for the Arts, 1965-1980, University of North Carolina Press, 312pp., 2004. .

External links
South Arts Web site
Performing Arts Exchange web site
Tradition/Innovation: a touring arts exhibit created by South Arts
US Regional Arts Organizations
From Blues to Benton to Bluegrass Creative economies report compiled by the Southern Legislative Conference and South Arts
SouthernArtistry.org: The Lives and Work of Outstanding Southern Artists

Southern art
Culture of the Southern United States
Arts organizations based in Georgia (U.S. state)
National Endowment for the Arts
Arts organizations established in 1975
1975 establishments in Georgia (U.S. state)
Organizations based in Atlanta
Non-profit organizations based in Georgia (U.S. state)